The Yamaha XV1000 or Virago 1000 was a Yamaha V-twin cruiser motorcycle. The XV920 was redesigned in 1984 and engine size increased to 981 cc (59.9 cu in) resulting in the renamed XV1000.  Made from 1984 through 1985, it was part of Yamaha's Virago line of cruisers.    In 1986, engine size was again increased to 1,063 cc (64.9 cu in), resulting in the renamed XV1100.

See also
 Yamaha XV920
 Yamaha XV1100

References

Virago 1000
Cruiser motorcycles
Motorcycles introduced in 1984